In mathematics, the slice theorem refers to
The slice theorem in differential geometry, or
 Luna's slice theorem, an analog in algebraic geometry.